The FMW Independent Heavyweight Championship was a professional wrestling world heavyweight championship contested in Frontier Martial-Arts Wrestling (FMW). It was one of the top two titles in the company, along with the FMW Brass Knuckles Heavyweight Championship. The title belt was created for Atsushi Onita to use in his retirement match at 6th Anniversary Show in 1995 but could not be shipped to FMW at that time and the title was finally shipped to FMW in 1996 and FMW used it as the alternative top title to the Brass Knuckles Heavyweight Championship. Both titles were unified later that year and were collectively referred to as "FMW Double Championship". The titles were separated in 1999 and deactivated later that year in favor of the new WEW Single Championship.

History

FMW requested a new customized FMW Brass Knuckles Heavyweight Championship belt for Atsushi Onita to defend it against Hayabusa in the former's retirement match at 6th Anniversary Show on May 5, 1995 but the title could not be created at that time. The title was shipped a year later to FMW in 1996 when Onita had already retired from in-ring competition and FMW would have two Brass Knuckles Championship belts. FMW used the second title belt as a new alternative world heavyweight championship naming it the "FMW Independent Heavyweight Championship" and an eight-man single-elimination tournament was conducted to determine the inaugural champion and the tournament took place during a period of three months. W*ING Kanemura defeated Masato Tanaka in the finals of the tournament to become the inaugural champion at Summer Spectacular on August 1, 1996. The title would then be unified with the Brass Knuckles Heavyweight Championship after Brass Knuckles Heavyweight Champion The Gladiator defeated the Independent Heavyweight Champion W*ING Kanemura in a title unification match at Year End Spectacular on December 11. Both titles would then be defended collectively as the "Double Titles Championship" or simply the "Double Championship" for the next two and a half years.

On May 18, 1999, the FMW Commissioner Kodo Fuyuki vacated and split the Double Championship and split the Indepdendent Heavyweight Championship from the Brass Knuckles Heavyweight Championship as separate titles, awarding the Independent Heavyweight Championship to Mr. Gannosuke, making him the first two-time champion. During this time, Fuyuki decided to change the promotion's name from FMW to World Entertainment Wrestling (WEW) but FMW President Shoichi Arai rejected the request and allowed him to change the name of the FMW titles to WEW titles instead. On August 25, the Independent Heavyweight Championship and the Brass Knuckles Heavyweight Championship were retired at the Goodbye Hayabusa II: Last Match event, where both titles were defended for the final time. Champion Masato Tanaka defeated Yukihiro Kanemura at the event to retain the title in the final defense of the Independent Heavyweight Championship to become the final Independent Heavyweight Champion. The title belts were auctioned and a new WEW World Heavyweight Championship was created instead as the sole world championship of FMW.

Inaugural tournament

Title history

Names

Reigns

Combined reigns

See also
FMW Brass Knuckles Heavyweight Championship
WEW Heavyweight Championship

References

External links
FMW Independent Heavyweight Championship official title history at FMW Wrestling
FMW Independent Heavyweight Championship title history at Wrestling-titles.com

Frontier Martial-Arts Wrestling championships
Heavyweight wrestling championships
Hardcore wrestling championships